Albert Jones Baker (February 28, 1906 – November 6, 1982) was an American Major League Baseball (MLB) pitcher who played for the Boston Red Sox in the 1938 season. He made three relief appearances without a decision and posted a 9.39 earned run average with two strikeouts and two walks in  innings pitched. Baker was born in Batesville, Mississippi, and died in Kenedy, Texas, at the age of 76.

External links

Retrosheet

1906 births
1982 deaths
Baseball players from Mississippi
People from Batesville, Mississippi
Major League Baseball pitchers
Boston Red Sox players
Chattanooga Lookouts players
Columbus Red Birds players
Dallas Steers players
Danville Veterans players
Decatur Commodores players
Denver Bears players
Knoxville Smokies players
Little Rock Travelers players
Minneapolis Millers (baseball) players
Mission Reds players
Nashville Vols players
Natchez Pilgrims players
Oklahoma City Indians players
Omaha Packers players
Springfield Cardinals players
Vicksburg Hill Billies players